The Vietnam national beach soccer team represents Vietnam in international beach soccer competitions and is controlled by the Vietnam Football Federation, the governing body for football in the Vietnam.

Competitive records

FIFA Beach Soccer World Cup

AFC Beach Soccer Asian Cup

Asian Beach Games

AFF Beach Soccer Championship

Schedules and results
All times are UTC+7

2014 AFF Beach Soccer Championship

Beach soccer at the 2014 Asian Beach Games

2015 AFC Beach Soccer Championship

2016 Beach Soccer Continment

2016 AFF Beach Soccer Championship

2017 AFC Beach Soccer Championship

Players

Current squad
Caps and goals correct as of 21 March 2015.

Head coach:  Trương Công Tuấn

Recent call-ups
The following players have been called up within the last 12 months.

Coaching staff

Sponsorship
Primary sponsors includes:
 Yanmar
 Grand Sport
 Suzuki Vietnam
 Sony Vietnam
 Z.com
 VPMilk
 Acecook
Local sponsor includes:

 
 Petro Vietnam
 Hoa Sen Group
 Kova Paint
 Next Media
 Dong Luc Group
 Viettel Mobile
 Cuulong Steel
 Thai Son Nam Group
 Canh Buom Do Group
 Huu Lien A Chau Joint-Stock Company

Coaches

Honours
AFC Beach Soccer Championship
Appearances (2): 2015, 2017

Asian Beach Games
4th place (1): 2014
Appearances (5): 2008, 2010, 2012, 2014, 2016

AFF Beach Soccer Championship
 Winner (1): 2018
 Runner-up (2): 2014, 2019
Appearances (3): 2014, 2018, 2019

See also
 Football in Vietnam
 Vietnam Football Federation
 Vietnam national football team
 Vietnam national under-23 football team
 Vietnam national under-19 football team
 Vietnam national under-16 football team
 Vietnam national futsal team

References

External links
 
 

Asian national beach soccer teams
Beach soccer in Vietnam
B